Amanda Marsalis is an American film director and photographer.

Career

Photographic career 
Marsalis attended California College of Arts and Crafts where she studied with Larry Sultan and Jim Goldberg.

Directing career
Marsalis made her directorial debut with the film Echo Park starring Mamie Gummer and Tony Okungbowa. The film premiered at the 2014 Los Angeles Film Festival. It was acquired for distribution in 2016 by ARRAY.  She said that Rebecca Walker, an author with whom she had worked previously, referred her to the producers when they said they were looking for a director.

Marsalis directed 6 episodes of the critically acclaimed Netflix series Ozark, including 4 episodes of the final season.

References

External links

Fashion photographers
Living people
American women film directors
Year of birth missing (living people)
Place of birth missing (living people)
American photographers
21st-century American women
21st-century American women photographers
21st-century American photographers